Carl Gustaf Hammarsten (born 2 September 1967) is a Swedish film, television and theatre actor. He is internationally known for his role in Brüno (2009) as the title character's sidekick and gay lover.

Career

Film
He has appeared in more than ten films, starting with a small role in The Best Intentions (1992) directed by Bille August.  He is best known for his appearance in Together (2000) directed by Lukas Moodysson.

Hammarsten made his international film début in Brüno (2009) as Lutz, the title character's sidekick. He has since appeared as the young Harald in David Fincher's remake of The Girl with the Dragon Tattoo, Kursk, Old, Lord of Chaos and Stockholm.

Television
In Swedish television he became known through the comedy show Cleo. He has also made numerous appearances in television programs. He appeared in the first episode of Crimes of Passion. Since 2013 he acts in the series Fröken Frimans krig.
He participated in the Let's Dance 2018 broadcast on TV4.

Theatre
Hammarsten is connected with the Stockholm City Theatre.

References

External links

Database (undated).  "Gustaf Hammarsten".  Profile from Variety.  Accessed 14 January 2010.
Murray, Rebecca (undated).  "Bruno Premiere Photo: Gustaf Hammarsten".  (Photograph of Hammarsten at Brüno première in Los Angeles, California, 25 June 2009.) about.com.  Accessed 14 January 2010.

1967 births
Living people
Male actors from Stockholm
Swedish male film actors
Swedish male stage actors
Swedish male television actors